James MacDonald (Scottish Gaelic: Séamus Mac Dhòmhnaill), alias McDonnell, 6th Chief of Clan MacDonald of Dunnyveg, Scottish-Gaelic lord, died 1565.

Biography
MacDonald was the son of Alexander MacDonald, lord of Islay and Kintyre (Cantire), and Catherine MacDonald, daughter of the Lord of Ardnamurchan. He organised the release of his brother, Sorley Boy MacDonnell, in 1551, in exchange for George Bustsyde, a prisoner he held after a battle on the island of Reachrainn (now Rathlin Island).

During the Battle of Glentasie on 2 May 1565, he and Sorley Boy were captured by Shane O'Neill and imprisoned. James succumbed to his wounds shortly after being captured, while being imprisoned at Castle Crocke, near Strathbane.

He was also known as "James MacConnel" at court.

Family
By his wife, Agnes, daughter of Colin Campbell, 3rd Earl of Argyll and Lady Jean Gordon, he was the father of: 
Archibald MacDonald, 7th of Dunnyveg, died without issue in 1569.
Angus MacDonald, 8th of Dunnyveg, died circa 1613.
Ranald MacDonald of Smerby, married a daughter of Bannatyne of Kames, died 1616.
Coll MacDonald, died at Eilean Mor Cormac.
Donald Gorm MacDonald of Carey, killed during the Battle of Ardnaree, Ireland in 1586.
Alexander Carragh MacDonald of Glenarm, also killed during the Battle of Ardnaree, Ireland in 1586.
Finola MacDonald (Fionnghuala MacDonald), married Sir Hugh O'Donnell Irish name: Sir Aodh mac Magnusa Ó Domhnaill, Chief of the Name of Clan O'Donnell, King of Tír Chonaill, through him she became the mother to Red Hugh O'Donnell, Rory O'Donnell, 1st Earl of Tyrconnell, and Cathbar O'Donnell. She died circa 1608.

References

1565 deaths
James
16th-century Scottish people
People of Elizabethan Ireland
James
People from Argyll and Bute
Year of birth unknown